Yevgeny Yuryevich Mileshkin (born 3 September 1960) is a former Russian professional footballer.

Honours
 Soviet Top League runner-up: 1983.
 Soviet Cup finalist: 1990.

External links

1960 births
Footballers from Moscow
Living people
Soviet footballers
Soviet expatriate footballers
Russian footballers
Russian expatriate footballers
Expatriate footballers in Poland
Expatriate footballers in Finland
FC Lokomotiv Moscow players
FC Spartak Moscow players
FC Dynamo Moscow players
Polonia Warsaw players
FC Shinnik Yaroslavl players
Soviet Top League players
Russian expatriate sportspeople in Poland
Association football defenders
Pallo-Kerho 37 players
FC Volgar Astrakhan players